Dvorishche is a rural locality (a village) in Gorodishchenskoye Rural Settlement, Nyuksensky District, Vologda Oblast, Russia. The population was 4 as of 2002.

Geography 
Dvorishche is located 37 km southeast of Nyuksenitsa (the district's administrative centre) by road. Nizhneye Kamennoye is the nearest rural locality.

References 

Rural localities in Nyuksensky District